In broadcast programming and motion pictures, a tent-pole or tentpole is a program or film that supports the financial performance of a film studio, television network, or cinema chain. It is an analogy for the way a strong central pole provides a stable structure to a tent. A tent-pole film may be expected to support the sale of tie-in merchandise.

Types 

In the film industry, tent-poles are sometimes widely released initial offerings in a string of releases and are expected by studios to turn a profit in a short period of time. Such programming is often accompanied by larger budgets and heavy promotion. A tentpole movie, for example, is a film that is expected to support a wide range of ancillary tie-in products such as toys and games.

Examples
An example of this strategy in television is to schedule a popular television program alongside new or unknown programming, in an attempt to keep audience viewers watching after the flagship program is over; a prominent example is the long-running Star Trek series. A related concept is the hammock: in broadcast programming, if a network has two tent-pole series, it can boost the performance of a weak or emerging show by inserting it between the two tent-poles.

See also 
 Audience flow
Blockbuster (entertainment)
 Event movie
 Four-quadrant movie
 List of highest-grossing films

References 

Film and video terminology
Television terminology